Abutilon Island is located approximately  off the coast from Onslow in the Pilbara region of Western Australia.

Description

Fauna
The archipelago is home to the hawksbill turtle, the flatback turtle and the green turtle although none are known to nest on Abutilon.

Birds found on the island include threatened species like the wedge-tailed shearwater, the bridled tern, the crested tern and the lesser crested tern.

See also
 List of islands of Western Australia

References

Lowendal Islands